Jorge Colaço (26 February 1868 - 23 August 1942) was a Portuguese painter specially known for his works as tile (azulejo) painter.

Jorge Colaço was born in Tangier, Morocco, the son of a Portuguese diplomat. He studied art in Lisbon, Madrid and Paris.

Even though Jorge Colaço was a canvas painter and caricaturist, he specialised in designing and painting azulejo panels to decorate large surfaces. His designs had a late Romantic taste, celebrating the achievements of Portuguese history. Along with historical themes, he also produced ethnographic and landscape scenes.

Among his most important works are tile panels in the Palace Hotel of Bussaco (1907); São Bento railway station in Porto (1905–1916); Sports Pavilion of Eduardo VII Park in Lisbon (1922); façade of the Church of Saint Ildefonso in Porto (1932) and many others. He also has works in Brazil, England (Windsor Castle), Geneva (Centre William Rappard) and other countries.

Gallery

References

1868 births
1942 deaths
Portuguese caricaturists
People from Tangier
19th-century Portuguese painters
19th-century male artists
20th-century Portuguese painters
20th-century male artists
Portuguese male painters